, also referred to as Hyogo No.1 district and  in Japanese, is a constituency of the House of Representatives in the national Diet of Japan. It is located in southwestern Hyogo Prefecture and consists of the Chūō, Nada and Higashinada wards of Kobe. As of September 2015, 378,434 eligible voters were registered in the district. It is one of the 48 districts in the Kansai region that form the Kinki proportional representation block.

The district was established as part of the electoral reform of 1994; the area was previously part of Hyōgo 1st district, which covered the whole of Kobe and elected five representatives by single non-transferable vote. The reform abolished the system of multi-member districts that had existed since 1947 and replaced them with small single-member districts coupled with large multi-member proportional representation blocks.

In seven elections since the district's creation, five representatives from four different parties have been elected, with only the first member Hajime Ishii winning consecutive elections.

List of representatives

Election results

See also
Hyogo at-large district, a multi-member district that represents the entire Hyogo Prefecture in the House of Councillors

References 

Districts of the House of Representatives (Japan)